Scorton railway station (North Yorkshire) was a railway station in what is now the Richmondshire district of North Yorkshire, England.

History
The station was once part of the Eryholme-Richmond branch line, built by the York and Newcastle Railway in 1846. Like most of the infrastructure of the line, Scorton station was built in the Tudor Style. The station buildings were on the 'down' side of the station on the Richmond bound platform. Passenger traffic to the station was buoyed by pupils going to and from the grammar school, passenger traffic for the Hospital of St John and God, and during the Second World War, service personnel for RAF Scorton.

The station had a goods yard with a connection that faced westwards. Records show that the station could handle livestock as well as general goods, with hay, clover and barley being the main commodities railed from the station. The goods yard closed in August 1965.

Passenger services on the Richmond branch line were withdrawn on 3 March 1969, however, freight traffic continued for another year, lasting until early 1970.

Present
The station is now a residential property, the waiting room is now the lounge and the platforms are garden features.

Much of the trackbed to the west of Scorton station has been destroyed by sand and gravel quarrying.

See also
 List of closed railway lines in Great Britain
 List of closed railway stations in Britain

References

Sources

External links

Scorton station on navigable 1947 O. S. map
Scorton station, SubBrit disused stations project

Disused railway stations in North Yorkshire
Railway stations in Great Britain opened in 1846
Railway stations in Great Britain closed in 1969
Former North Eastern Railway (UK) stations
Beeching closures in England